Hopea helferi is a critically endangered species of plant in the family Dipterocarpaceae. It is found in Cambodia, the Andaman Islands of India, Peninsular Malaysia, Myanmar, and Thailand.

References

helferi
Trees of Indo-China
Trees of Peninsular Malaysia
Critically endangered flora of Asia
Taxonomy articles created by Polbot